Andrew Oldcorn (born 31 March 1960) is a Scottish professional golfer.

Oldcorn was born in Bolton, Lancashire, England. He was raised in Edinburgh, and represents Scotland. He represented England as an amateur and won the English Amateur in 1982, turning professional after playing for Great Britain & Ireland in the 1983 Walker Cup.

Oldcorn was medalist at the European Tour final Qualifying School in 1983. He had a steady start to his career on tour before being struck down with ME (also known as Chronic Fatigue Syndrome) in the early 1990s. He returned to form in 1993, to claim his first tour victory in the Turespana Masters Open de Andalucia. Away from the tour he also won the Sunderland of Scotland Masters. Several solid years followed along with another title, the 1995 DHL Jersey Open. The undoubted highlight of his career came in 2001 when he became the oldest winner in the history of the Volvo PGA Championship (although Miguel Ángel Jiménez would later beat that record). He finished that season a career best 26th place on the European Tour Order of Merit.

Since turning 50, Oldcorn has primarily been playing on the senior golf tours, having won twice on the European Senior Tour.

Amateur wins
1979 Scottish Youths Amateur Championship
1982 English Amateur

Professional wins (6)

European Tour wins (3)

Other wins (1)
1993 Sunderland of Scotland Masters

European Senior Tour wins (2)

European Senior Tour playoff record (1–0)

Results in major championships

Note: Oldcorn never played in the Masters Tournament nor the U.S. Open.

CUT = missed the half-way cut
WD = Withdrew
"T" = tied

Team appearances
Amateur
Eisenhower Trophy (representing Great Britain & Ireland): 1982
St Andrews Trophy (representing Great Britain & Ireland): 1982
Walker Cup (representing Great Britain & Ireland): 1983
European Amateur Team Championship (representing England): 1983

Professional
Seve Trophy: 2002 (winners)

References

External links

Scottish male golfers
European Tour golfers
European Senior Tour golfers
PGA Tour Champions golfers
People with chronic fatigue syndrome
People from Bolton
Golfers from Edinburgh
1960 births
Living people